Španac (eng: The Spaniard) may refer to:

People 
Nickname of the Yugoslav volunteers in the Spanish Civil War (1936–1939):
 Milan Blagojević Španac, (1905–1941), Yugoslav partisan.
 Žikica Jovanović Španac, (1914–1942), Yugoslav partisan